Love is the ninth studio album by Cloud Cult, released on March 5, 2013.

MTV compared the album's first single, "Good Friend," to Polyphonic Spree, Arcade Fire, and Weezer.

Track listing
All songs written by Craig Minowa.
 You’re the Only Thing in Your Way
 It’s Your Decision
 Complicated Creation
 1x1x1
 All the Things We Couldn’t See
 The Calling
 Love and the First Law of Thermodynamics
 Good Friend
 Meet Me Where You’re Going
 Sleepwalker
 It Takes a Lot
 Catharsis
 The Show Starts Now

References

2013 albums
Cloud Cult albums